Koji Steven Sakai is an American screenwriter and producer. He has written the screenplay for The People I've Slept With (2009), a romantic comedy film directed by Quentin Lee and starring Karin Anna Cheung and Archie Kao as well as Wilson Cruz, Lynn Chen, Randall Park, James Shigeta and more. He also served as a producer for that film as well. Sakai has also co-written the screenplay for a horror film entitled The Haunted Highway (2006) along with Naoko Ihara Witmer and directed by Junichi Suzuki, which was distributed by Lions Gate DVD in 2005. In 2013, he wrote and produced the "first Asian American serial killer film" entitled Chink, starring Jason Tobin, Eugenia Yuan, Tzi Ma and more, which was directed by Stanley Yung and produced by Quentin Lee. For Chink, lead actor Jason Tobin won a Special Jury Prize for Best Actor or "Breakout Performance" at the 2013 Los Angeles Asian Pacific Film Festival.

In June 2012, Sakai's screenplay Romeo, Juliet & Rosaline  was selected by Amazon Studios for its Movie Development Slate. The comedy script is co-written with Emily Brauer Rogers and focuses on Rosaline, Romeo’s original crush. Monster & Me, was released in November 2012.

Koji wrote and produced the feature film, The Commando, starring Michael Jai White and Oscar nominee Mickey Rourke and was directed by Asif Akbar. The Commando was released by Paramount Pictures in January 2022.

Koji’s latest feature film, Skeletons in the Closet, recently completed production in Las Vegas. Skeletons was directed by Lance Kawas and Asif Akbar and stars Oscar nominee Terrence Howard (Hustle & Flow, Empire), Oscar winner Cuba Gooding Jr (Jerry Maguire), Clifton Powell (Ray), and Valery M. Ortiz (2 Minutes of Fame). Koji was credited as a writer and producer on this project.

In February 2015, Sakai's debut novel Romeo & Juliet Vs. Zombies was released by Luthando Coeur, the fantasy imprint of Zharme Publishing Press.

Sakai has also graduated from the University of Southern California's Masters of Professional Writing program and has also held several filmmaking fellowships, including Visual Communications "Armed With A Camera" Fellowship for Emerging Media Artists and Film Independent's Project Involve. He currently lives in Los Angeles and is also affiliated with the Japanese American National Museum. He is also a contributor to 8-Asians.com and Discover Nikkei.

References

External links

Koji Steven Sakai on AliveNotDead
Writer Koji Steven Sakai of 'The People I've Slept With' - Hyphen Magazine

American male screenwriters
Living people
Year of birth missing (living people)